Cássio Motta  (born 22 February 1960) is a former professional tennis player from Brazil. He played in the mixed doubles final of the French Open with Cláudia Monteiro in 1982.

Grand Slam mixed doubles finals

Runners-up (1)

Career finals

Doubles (10 wins, 13 losses)

Singles (1 loss)

References

External links 
 
 
 

Brazilian male tennis players
Tennis players from São Paulo
Brazilian people of Italian descent
1960 births
Living people